Scott Adam Barry (August 3, 1976) is currently an American umpire in Major League Baseball (MLB). Scott made his debut as an MLB reserve umpire in 2006, and 2011 was his first full-time season as an MLB umpire.  He lives in Quincy, Michigan.

Early career
Barry officiated in the 2006 World Baseball Classic, which used mostly minor league umpires. In 2007, Barry was the replacement umpire for Mike Winters after the latter was suspended for his part in an altercation with then-San Diego Padres outfielder Milton Bradley. Winters had allegedly profanely insulted Bradley prior to the altercation in which Bradley tore his ACL. In 2011, Barry was one of two MLB umpires (the other being Brian O'Nora) who were selected to officiate in the Taiwan All-Star Series; Barry and O'Nora were joined by two Taiwanese umpires for the games.

In August 2010, during a game between the Atlanta Braves and the Washington Nationals, Barry ejected Nationals third baseman Ryan Zimmerman for tossing his bat after a strikeout. Zimmerman later claimed that he was frustrated for striking out, but that "Barry believed the bat and helmet tossing... was directed at the umpire". It was the second consecutive night with a Nationals ejection by Barry, as he had tossed 14-time All-Star catcher Iván Rodríguez on August 18 for disputing a check-swing strike call. A few days later he ejected Philadelphia Phillies first baseman Ryan Howard in a 16-inning game against the Houston Astros for throwing his bat toward the dugout.

Barry umpired in the 2014 MLB All-Star Game as well as the American League Division Series in 2012 and 2014. He wears uniform number 87.

See also 

 List of Major League Baseball umpires

References

External links
 Major League Umpire Roster – MLB.com
 Retrosheet

Major League Baseball umpires
Living people
1976 births
People from Battle Creek, Michigan
People from Quincy, Michigan